Hacride is a French progressive metal band. Formed in 2001 with musicians coming from an array of different bands, musical backgrounds and styles their sound has evolved from the raw extremities and odd time signatures of technical death metal to one that is more progressive and avant-garde.

Biography
Hacride was formed in 2001 in the French city of Poitiers by Benoist Danneville (bass), Adrien Grousset (guitar), Samuel Bourreau (vocals) and Olivier Laffond (drums). In 2003 they released their first promo CD entitled Cyanide Echoes, then produced with Matthieu Metzger.

In 2005, the band appeared on the compilation Revolution Calling with the song "The Daily Round" through record label Listenable Records. In the same year they recorded their first full-length album called Deviant Current Signal and released it with the same record label. The band promoted this album in France and Switzerland through Deviant Tours I and II. They also took part in the VS Fest II at Loco in Paris on May 28, 2006.

In 2007, their second album Amoeba was recorded, again co-produced by the band members themselves, along with Franck Hueso, and released through Listenable Records.

Hacride released their third album Lazarus on April 20, 2009.

On April 19, 2013, Hacride released their fourth album, Back to Where You've Never Been on Indie Recordings.

In October 2013, the band embarked on a UK tour with support from Ten Cent Toy.

On July 27, 2017, Hacride independently released the EP, Chapter I: Inconsolabilis, as a digital only release via Bandcamp.

Band members
Members
 Luis Roux − vocals (2012–present)
 Florent Marcadet − drums (2012–present)
 Adrien Grousset − guitar (2001–present)
 Benoist Danneville − bass (2001–present)

Past members
 Mike Roponus − drums (2010–2012)
 Samuel Bourreau − vocals (2001-2012)
 Olivier Laffond − drums (2001–2010)

Timeline

Discography
 2003: Cyanide Echoes (EP)
 2005: Deviant Current Signal
 2007: Amoeba
 2009: Lazarus
 2013: Back to Where You've Never Been
 2017: Inconsolabilis (EP)

References

External links
 
 Live at Deccan Rock III, Hyderabad

French death metal musical groups
Musical groups established in 2001
Musical quartets
Technical death metal musical groups
French progressive metal musical groups
Musical groups from Nouvelle-Aquitaine
Listenable Records artists